Lisa Hsiao Chen is a Taiwan-born, Brooklyn-based writer, most famous for the widely reviewed autofiction Activities of Daily Living.

Biography
Chen was born in Taipei, Taiwan. She earned her B.A. from UC Berkeley and her M.F.A. from the University of Iowa.
=
Chen's debut poetry collection, Mouth, was published through Kaya Press in 2007. In an interview with Writer's Bone, Chen said she garnered inspiration for her collection from her email spam folder, ads, news items, conversation, and Hokusai’s 100 Views of Mount Fuji, among other influences. 

She has held residencies at the Lower Manhattan Cultural Council’s Workspace Program and Blue Mountain Center, and was a NYSCA/NYFA Artist Fellowship Finalist in Nonfiction Literature in 2017 and a Center for Fiction Emerging Writers Fellow from 2015 to 2016. She received a 2018 Rona Jaffe Foundation Writers' Award.

In an interview with the Sonora Review, Chen said she is interested in written forms "animated by what Viktor Shklovsky called ostranenie, or 'making strange'—sometimes translated as 'estrangement' or 'defamiliarization.'"

Awards and honors
In 2009, Mouth won the Book Award for Poetry from the Association for Asian American Studies.

Activities of Daily Living was longlisted for the inaugural Carol Shields Prize for Fiction in 2023.

References

External links 
 

Living people
Year of birth missing (living people)
Writers from Taipei
University of California, Berkeley alumni
University of Iowa alumni
Writers from Brooklyn
21st-century Taiwanese writers
21st-century Taiwanese women writers
21st-century American writers
21st-century American women writers
American writers of Taiwanese descent
Taiwanese emigrants to the United States